Vancleve is an unincorporated community in Breathitt County, Kentucky. Vancleve has a post office with ZIP code 41385, which opened on November 6, 1903. Kentucky Mountain Bible College is located in Vancleve.

References

Unincorporated communities in Breathitt County, Kentucky
Unincorporated communities in Kentucky